The Camoscellahorn (also known as Pizzo Pioltone) is a mountain of the Pennine Alps, located on the Swiss-Italian border. The closest locality is Gondo in the Swiss Val Divedro.

References

External links
 Camoscellahorn on Hikr

Mountains of the Alps
Mountains of Switzerland
Italy–Switzerland border
International mountains of Europe
Mountains of Valais
Two-thousanders of Switzerland